The Sykes family of Sledmere own Sledmere House in Yorkshire, England.

Family history
 
The Sykes family settled in Sykes Dyke near Carlisle in Cumberland during the Middle Ages. The earliest correspondence in the Sykes archives relates to Richard Sykes (1678–1726), from his factors in Danzig and local gentry.  William Sykes (1500–1577), migrated to the West Riding of Yorkshire, settling near Leeds, and he and his son became wealthy cloth traders.

Daniel Sykes (born 1632) was the first member of the family to begin trading in Hull and amassed a fortune from shipping and finance. Richard Sykes (1678–1726) diversified further, concentrating on the flourishing Baltic trade in bar iron, and the wealth of the family was built on this in the first half of the eighteenth century. He married Mary Kirkby, co-heiress to the Sledmere estates of Mark Kirkby, and, secondly, Martha Donkin. Two of his sons, Joseph Sykes (1723–1805) and Richard Sykes (1706–1761), managed the family business jointly.  They were leading participants in the cartel in oregrounds iron, the raw material for blister steel.  After Richard's death, Joseph continued this business alone, and members of the family continued it after his death until the 1850s.  Joseph had bought estates around West Ella and Kirk Ella.

Mark Sykes (1711–1783) was rector of Roos, and 1st baronet. His correspondence includes letters from the London merchant Henry de Ponthieu about the French in Canada 1761–63 and circa 100 letters from his London banker, Joseph Denison. He was succeeded at Sledmere by his one surviving child, Christopher Sykes (1749–1801), who was MP for Beverley 1784–90. In 1770 he made a fortunate marriage with Elizabeth, the daughter of William Tatton of Wythenshawe, Cheshire whose inheritance of £17,000 from her father was hugely augmented by her inheriting her brother's Cheshire estates and another £60,000 from her aunt in 1780. Christopher Sykes sold off shipping interests and government stock and he and his wife expanded the Sledmere estate. They bought and enclosed huge areas of land for cultivation and built two new wings to the house. The entire village of Sledmere was relocated. His correspondence includes two letters from the archbishop of York and about 270 letters from a wide range of people including William Carr of York and Henry Maister of Hull. Christopher Sykes's son, Mark Masterman Sykes (1771–1823), was a knowledgeable collector of books and fine arts, but these were sold when he died childless. He was succeeded by his younger brother, Sir Tatton Sykes, 4th Baronet (1772–1863), who had an interest in agricultural techniques and horse racing.

His only son, Sir Tatton Sykes (1826–1913), developed into a rather withdrawn man who sold his father's stud for £30,000 and restored seventeen churches. He married Jessica Cavendish-Bentinck (died 1912). Their one son, Mark Sykes (1879–1919) travelled in the Middle East and wrote Through five Turkish provinces and The Caliph's last heritage. He married Edith Gorst, and their honeymoon took them to Paris, Rome, Constantinople and Jerusalem. They had six children. Mark Sykes was elected MP for Central Hull in 1911 and occupied himself for the early part of the First World War establishing the Waggoner's Special Reserve. From May 1915 he was called to the War Office by Lord Kitchener and is largely remembered for the part he played in forging the Inter-Allied agreement about the Middle East in 1916, the Sykes-Picot Agreement. While in Paris during the peace conference Mark Sykes contracted influenza and died at the age of only 39. He was a key figure in Middle East policy decision-making and his papers are a source of material on policy. Sir Mark Sykes 6th Baronet was succeeded in the title and Sledmere estates by Sir Richard Sykes 7th Baronet (1905–1978) and then Sir Tatton Sykes 8th Baronet, born 1943.

Archives
The family archives include correspondence with Winston Churchill, Austen Chamberlain, Chaim Weizmann, Arthur Balfour, Francois Georges-Picot, T. E. Lawrence, Nahum Sokolow, C P Scott, W Ormesby-Gore, Sir Ronald Storrs, Alfred Dowling, E G Browne, Francis Maunsell, Grant Dalton and Oswald Fitzgerald.

Current Baronet
The current baronet of the Sledmere House, Yorkshire, is Sir Tatton Sykes 8th Baronet, who has three brothers.

See also
 Sykes Churches Trail

Notes and references

 P. W. King, The Cartel in oregrounds iron'. Journal of Industrial History 6(1) (2003), 25-48.

External links
  Sledmere estate papers. University of Hull

English families